Xatirchi District is a district of Navoiy Region in Uzbekistan. The capital lies at the city Yangirabod.

The district consists of one city (Yangirabod), 11 urban-type settlements (Langar, Jaloyir, Qoʻshchinor, Polvontepa, Qoʻrgʻon, Tasmachi, Bogʻishamol, Gʻalabek, Paxtakor, Turkman, Yangi qurilish) and 9 rural communities (Sahovat, Olchinobod, Oʻzbekiston, Bogʻchakalon, Xonaqa, Qoracha, Pulkan shoir, Yangirabod, Koʻksaroy).

References

Navoiy Region
Districts of Uzbekistan